Qaleh-ye Faramarzi (also Romanized as Qal‘eh-ye Farāmarzī, Qal‘eh-ye Farāmarz, Qal‘eh Farāmuz, and Qal‘eh-ye Farāmarz)  is a village in Malard Rural District, in the Central District of Malard County, Tehran Province, Iran. At the 2006 census, its population was 2,812, in 766 families.

References 

Populated places in Malard County